A freewheel is a device in a transmission that disengages the driveshaft from the driven shaft when the driven shaft rotates faster than the driveshaft.

Freewheel or freewheeling may also refer to:
 Freewheel (bicycle part)
 Freewheel (song)
 Freewheeling (film)

See also
 Freewheelers (disambiguation)